Lages Station is a ghost town in White Pine County, in the U.S. state of Nevada. As of 2007, the town's only remaining inhabitants were a single family, running the town's only operating business, a gas station.

References

Ghost towns in White Pine County, Nevada
Historic districts in Nevada
Ghost towns in Nevada
Great Basin National Heritage Area